Giza (sometimes spelled Gizah, Geeza, Standard Arabic: Jiza) is the third-largest city in Egypt by area after Alexandria and Cairo; and fourth-largest city in Africa by population after Kinshasa, Lagos and Cairo. It is the capital of Giza Governorate with a total population of 9.2 million as of 2021.

Giza is most famous as the location of the Giza Plateau, the site of some of the most impressive ancient monuments in the world, including a complex of ancient Egyptian royal mortuary and sacred structures, including the Great Sphinx, the Great Pyramid of Giza, and a number of other large pyramids and temples. Giza has always been a focal point in Egypt's history due to its location close to Memphis, the ancient pharaonic capital of the Old Kingdom.

Districts and population 
The city of Giza is the capital of the Giza Governorate, and is located near the northeast border of this governorate.

2017 Population and administrative divisions

Giza city is a municipal division and capital of Giza governorate with an appointed city head. It comprises nine districts (ahya', singl. hayy) and five new towns (mudun jadidah).

The districts/qisms fully subsume to the city head and according to the 2017 census had 4,872,448 residents:

The new towns are mostly administered by the national level New Urban Communities Authority (NUCA), with some public services under the jurisdiction of Giza. They are confusingly named madina (city), however they are not administravely incorporated as such where many are formed of a single district/qism. Ones not in the 2017 census as they were not yet incorporated, or inhabited then are:

New 6th of October

October Gardens

New Sphinx

Permanently inhabited Nile islands:

 Qorsaya Island (Janoub/Giza district)
 Dahab Island  (Janoub/Giza district)
 Al-Warraq Island (Al-Warraq district)

2006 population 
The city's population was reported as 2,681,863 in the 2006 national census, while the governorate had 6,272,571 at the same census, without specifying what the city is. The former figure corresponds to the sum of 9 districts/qisms.

Geography and history 
Giza's most famous landform and archaeological site, the Giza Plateau, holds some major monuments of Egyptian history, and is home to the Great Sphinx. Once thriving with the Nile that flowed right into the Giza Plateau, the pyramids of Giza were built overlooking the ancient Egyptian capital city of Memphis, across the river from modern day Cairo. The Great Pyramid of Giza at one time was advocated (1884) as the location for the Prime Meridian, a reference point used for determining a base longitude.

Climate
Giza experiences a hot desert climate like arid climate (Köppen: BWh). Its climate is similar to Cairo, owing to its proximity. Wind storms can be frequent across Egypt in spring, bringing Saharan dust into the city during the months of March and April. Rain is infrequent in Giza; snow is extremely rare.

History

Ancient era

The area in what is now Giza served as the necropolis of several pharaohs who ruled ancient Egypt, during the second millennium BC. Three of these tombs, in the form of giant pyramids, are what is now the famed Giza pyramid complex, featuring the Great Pyramid of Giza.

Classical to medieval era

As ancient Egypt passed under several conquests under the Persians, Greeks, Romans and Byzantines, so did the area in what is now Giza. A Byzantine village named Phylake or Terso (meaning "the fortress", now Tersa) was located south of Giza and should not be confused with it.

Egyptians called the area Tipersis (Bohairic  and Sahidic ). Eutychius gives a legend the about city's name and its foundation by Artaxerxes Ochus, while Abu Salih says it was found by a Persian king Hūš at the same time as Qasr ash-Sham, but in view of the fact that older evidence is missing, it is perhaps most likely to have been founded during the Sasanian conquest of Egypt in the early 7th century.

As Muslims of the fledgling Islamic caliphate went on with their conquest of Egypt from the Byzantine Empire beginning in 639 AD, three years after their victory at the battle of Yarmouk in 636 AD, they conquered all of the land by the time they captured the city of Alexandria in 641 AD. A year later in 642 AD (year 21 in Islamic calendar), they founded the city of Giza. The exact etymology of its name is unknown. Al-Maqrizi suggested an irregular Arameo-Arabic root meaning "edge, side" to be the source. Everett-Heath suggested   "on the side of the height (pyramid)".

Infrastructure

Giza has seen many changes over time. Changes in infrastructure during the different occupations of Egypt by various rulers, including the British in the 18th and early 20th century, focused on the construction of roads, streets, and buildings in the area. Giza is a thriving centre of Egyptian culture and is quite heavily populated, with many facilities and buildings in the current area. Giza saw much attention in particular to its vast amount of ancient Egyptian monuments found on the Giza Plateau, and has astonished thousands of visitors and tourists over the years. Giza's infrastructure saw much attention from both the British government prior to the 1952 coup d'état, as well as the current Egyptian government due to the city's importance in tourism. Giza's St. George Cathedral is the episcopal see of the Coptic Catholic Eparchy of Giza.

The city hosts the first zoo on the entire African continent and one of the oldest in the Mediterranean region, the Giza Zoo. In addition, there are several parks, the most famous among them is Orman Park, which means "Forest Park" in the Turkish language.

Transportation

Transportation in Giza comprises an extensive road network, rail system, subway system, and maritime services. Road transport is facilitated by personal vehicles, taxi cabs, privately owned public buses and microbuses.

Giza shares with Cairo a subway system, officially called the "Metro (مترو)", a fast and efficient way of getting around. An extensive road network connects Giza with 6th of October City, Cairo and other cities. There are flyovers and bridges such as the 15th. Giza traffic is known to be overwhelming and overcrowded.

 Cairo Taxi
 Uber (Available in Cairo and Giza since 2015)
 Careem (Available in Cairo and Giza since 2015)
 Swvl (Available in Cairo and Giza since 2017) (A new concept of shared rides within Egypt). 
Water Taxis (Motorized Feluccas) available for transport to nearby places along the Nile River

Economy

Industries here include movies, chemicals, Giza cotton, machinery and cigarettes. In addition, Giza has many luxury apartment buildings along the Nile, making it a popular place to live.

International access
Access to the city of Giza, which has its own governorate adjacent to the Governorate of Cairo, is dependent on the Cairo International Airport. Another local airport is found in Giza, called the Imbaba Airport, but recently the Egyptian government has decided to shut down the area and turn it into a cultural or an athletic area.

Sphinx International Airport opened in 2018.

Education

Giza's learning institutions include Cairo University, which was moved to Giza in 1924. The city is a hub of education and educational services not only for Egypt but also for the entire Mediterranean Region. Giza has numerous schools, kindergartens, and institutes of higher learning.

The Cairo Japanese School, a Japanese international school, is in Giza. The Deutsche Evangelische Oberschule, a German international school, is located in Dokki in Giza. Previously the Pakistan International School of Cairo had its campus in Giza.

Sports

The city hosts the second most successful sports club in Egypt and Africa, El Zamalek, which is located in the Meet Okba neighbourhood near the Mohandesin neighbourhood. Beside El Zamalek there are other clubs like El Tersana and Seid Shooting Club which is one of the elite clubs in Egypt.

Twin towns and sister cities 

Giza is twinned with:

  Bandar Seri Begawan, Brunei Darussalam
  Bergen, Norway
  Los Angeles, United States
  Rinkeby, Stockholm, Sweden

See also

 Giza church fire
 List of cities and towns in Egypt
 List of ancient Egyptian sites
 List of megalithic sites

References

Further reading
Der Manuelian, Peter. 2017. Digital Giza: Visualizing the Pyramids. Cambridge, Massachusetts: Harvard University Press.
Hawass, Zahi A. 2010. Wonders of the Pyramids: The Sound and Light of Giza. Cairo: Misr Company for Sound, Light, & Cinema.
--. 2011. Newly-Discovered Statues From Giza, 1990–2009. Cairo: Ministry of State for Antiquities.
Magli, G. 2016. "The Giza 'written' landscape and the double project of King Khufu." Time & Mind-the Journal of Archaeology Consciousness and Culture 9, no.1: 57–74.
Khattab, Hind A. S., Nabil Younis, and Huda Zurayk. 1999. Women, Reproduction, and Health In Rural Egypt: The Giza Study. Cairo, Egypt: American University in Cairo Press.
Kormysheva, Ė. E., Svetlana Malykh, and Sergey Vetokhov. 2010. Giza, Eastern Necropolis: Russian Archaeological Mission In Giza. Moscow: Institute of Oriental Studies, Russian Academy of Sciences.
Lawton, Ian, and Chris Ogilvie-Herald. 2000. Giza: The Truth: the People, Politics and History Behind the World's Most Famous Archaeological Site. Rev. ed. London: Virgin.
Lehner, Mark, and Zahi A. Hawass. 2017. Giza and the Pyramids: The Definitive History. Chicago: The University of Chicago Press.

 
642 establishments
Cities in Egypt
Giza Plateau
Governorate capitals in Egypt
Metropolitan areas of Egypt
Populated places established in the 7th century
Populated places in Giza Governorate